VH1 HD was a Brazilian television channel dedicated to music programming, owned by ViacomCBS Networks Americas. It was launched on December 1, 2009, and started broadcasting in the rest of Latin America in 2014.

It specialized on airing current high-definition music videos. It had independent programming, separate from either VH1 Brazil or VH1 Latin America, both of which were centered on airing music videos from artists of the 1970s to the 1990s and thus was only broadcast in 4:3 SDTV.

The station never had its ratings measured. On October 7, 2020, VH1 HD was replaced by a high-definition simulcast of VH1 Europe. The latter also replaced VH1 Latin America, now serving as the channel's 4:3 letterboxed feed. The replacement came after some specialized channels of ViacomCBS were shut down, like MTV Hits Latin America (which was replaced with MTV Hits Europe) and VH1 MegaHits (which was replaced with NickMusic). Since VH1 Europe was replaced with MTV 00s in Europe, the VH1 HD channel was shut down in Latin America.

Music organisations based in Brazil
VH1
Television channels and stations established in 2009
Television channels and stations disestablished in 2020